Degrassi is a Canadian television franchise.

Degrassi may also refer to:

 The Kids of Degrassi Street, the original television series (1979–1986).
 Degrassi Junior High, the second series in the franchise (1987–1989).
 Degrassi High, the third series in the franchise, a direct continuation from Degrassi Junior High (1989–1991).
 Degrassi: The Next Generation, renamed Degrassi in the tenth season, is the fourth series in the franchise, with a new generation of characters (2001–2015).
 Degrassi: Next Class is the fifth series in the franchise, and is a direct continuation from Degrassi: The Next Generation (2016–2017).
 Degrassi Community School, the centric school, often referred to as "Degrassi" in universe
 Degrassi (band), a Scottish indie rock band
 "Degrassi", a song by Lemon Demon

People with the surname
 Attilio Degrassi (1887–1969), Italian scholar of Latin epigraphy

See also
 De Grassi (disambiguation)
 Di Grassi